Vorys, Sater, Seymour and Pease LLP is an international law firm based in Columbus, Ohio.  With approximately 400 attorneys working out of offices in California, Ohio, Pennsylvania, Texas, Washington, D.C., and London, the firm is among the largest 150 law firms in the United States, according to American Lawyer.

History
Vorys, Sater, Seymour and Pease was founded in 1909 by Arthur I. Vorys, Lowry F. Sater, Augustus T. Seymour, and Edward L. Pease.  The firm has been home to several generations of the Vorys family, many of whom have had ties to the government of Ohio as well as the federal government.

Practice areas
The firm is involved in lobbying at both the federal and state levels, and also has a broad range of practices, including intellectual property, entertainment law, labor & employment law, bankruptcy and creditors' rights, health law, insurance law, tax law, corporate law, international trade law, media & telecom law, real estate, environmental law, and trusts & estates.

The firm also has one subsidiary. Vorys Advisors LLC provides business and strategic counsel to Ohio businesses in manufacturing, health care, energy, real estate, venture capital, technology and other industries. Former Ohio Senate President Tom Niehaus serves as one of the principals for Vorys Advisors. Vorys Advisors was previously led by retired Congressman David Hobson (R-OH).

Notable lawyers and alumni
 John Martin Vorys, former Congressman for Ohio's 12th congressional district
 R. Guy Cole, Jr., judge on the United States Court of Appeals for the Sixth Circuit
 M. Peter McPherson, former deputy secretary of the United States Treasury and a former director of USAID
 Algenon L. Marbley, judge on United States District Court for the Southern District of Ohio, trustee for Ohio State University

Tom McDonald, U.S. Ambassador to Zimbabwe from 1997 to 2001 
 Matthew Barrett, casebook editor and law professor at Notre Dame Law School  
 Evelyn Lundberg Stratton, former Ohio Supreme Court Justice
 Paul Manafort, American lobbyist, political consultant and convicted criminal
Vorys Advisors 
David Hobson, retired Congressman for Ohio's 7th congressional district (no longer an advisor)
Zack Space, former Congressman for Ohio's 18th congressional district (no longer an advisor)
Tom Niehaus, former Ohio Senate President 
Lou Gentile, former Ohio Senate member

References

External links
 Vorys, Sater, Seymour and Pease home page
 Chambers USA profile
 See this firm's profile on Martindale.com
 Martindale.com augmented information with third-party sourced data to present a more comprehensive overview of the firm's expertise
 Article about the Vorys family from Moritz College of Law

Law firms established in 1909
Law firms based in Columbus, Ohio
Lobbying firms
Companies based in the Columbus, Ohio metropolitan area